Typically, members of the evangelical left affirm the primary tenets of evangelical theology, such as the doctrines of the incarnation, atonement, and resurrection, and also see the Bible as the primary authority for the Church. Unlike many evangelicals, however, those on the evangelical left often support and utilize modern biblical criticism and are open to more progressive interpretations of Christian beliefs. They often support a more progressive political platform as well. Many, for example, are opposed to capital punishment and supportive of gun control and welfare programs. In many cases, they are also pacifists.  While members of the evangelical left chiefly reside in mainline denominations, they are often heavily influenced by the Anabaptist social tradition. While the evangelical left is related to the wider Christian left, those who are part of the latter category are not always viewed as evangelical.

In his 2012 book, Moral Minority: The Evangelical Left in an Age of Conservatism (Politics and Culture in Modern America), David R. Swartz argues that during the 1960s and 1970s the evangelical left stood for antiwar, civil rights, and anticonsumer principles while supporting  doctrinal and sexual fidelity. Swartz documents the activities of large organizations of the evangelical left, including the Sojourners, InterVarsity Christian Fellowship, Evangelicals for Social Action, and the Association for Public Justice. He also explains how the evangelical left helped influence the broader evangelical movement by helping to elect the first born-again U.S. president, Jimmy Carter, and showing the evangelical right how to organize politically.

See also

 Christian anarchism
 Christian socialism
 Evangelical environmentalism
 Liberal Christianity
 Sojourners

References

Further reading

External links
 Evangelical Association for the Promotion of Education
 Evangelicals for Social Action 
 Every Church a Peace Church
 Social Redemption
 The Bible on the Poor: Or Why God is a Liberal
 The Christian Left -- An Open Fellowship of Progressive Christians

Evangelicalism in the United States
Christianity and politics
Christian terminology
Left-wing politics